Jason Isidore Gurka (born January 10, 1988) is an American professional baseball pitcher for the Mariachis de Guadalajara of the Mexican League. He previously played in Major League Baseball (MLB) for the Colorado Rockies and Los Angeles Angels.

Career

Baltimore Orioles
Gurka was drafted in the 15th round of the 2008 Major League Baseball Draft, 446th overall. He became a free agent following the 2009 season, but resigned on a minor league deal on June 17, 2010. Gurka spent time in the Orioles minor league system through the 2014 season before becoming a free agent after the season.

Colorado Rockies
Gurka signed a minor league deal with the Rockies on December 16, 2014. Gurka was called up to the majors for the first time on August 28, 2015.

He replaced Carlos Gonzalez in right field in the bottom of the sixteenth inning against the Los Angeles Dodgers on September 16, 2015. He elected free agency on December 2, 2015. On December 15, the Rockies re-signed Gurka to a minor league deal. His contract was selected to the majors on April 3, 2016. The Rockies organization released Gurka on August 20, 2016.

New York Yankees
On December 12, 2016, Gurka signed a minor league deal with the New York Yankees. He was assigned to the Scranton/Wilkes-Barre RailRiders. The Yankees released Gurka on June 2, 2017.

Los Angeles Angels
On June 5, 2017, Gurka signed a minor league contract with the Los Angeles Angels. On September 1, the Angels selected Gurka's contract. On October 9, the Angels designated him for assignment. He elected free agency on November 6, 2017.

Baltimore Orioles (second stint)
He signed a minor league contract with the Baltimore Orioles on December 1, 2017. He was assigned to AAA Norfolk Tides. Gurka was released from the organization on June 10, 2018.

Acereros de Monclova
On June 22, 2018, Gurka signed with the Acereros de Monclova of the Mexican League. Gurka did not play in a game in 2020 due to the cancellation of the Mexican League season because of the COVID-19 pandemic.

Mariachis de Guadalajara
On March 29, 2021, Gurka was traded to the Mariachis de Guadalajara of the Mexican League.

References

External links

1988 births
Living people
Aberdeen IronBirds players
Acereros de Monclova players
Albuquerque Isotopes players
American expatriate baseball players in Mexico
Angelina Roadrunners baseball players
Baseball players from Houston
Bluefield Orioles players
Bowie Baysox players
Colorado Rockies players
Delmarva Shorebirds players
Frederick Keys players
Los Angeles Angels players
Major League Baseball pitchers
Mariachis de Guadalajara players
Mexican League baseball pitchers
New Britain Rock Cats players
Norfolk Tides players
Salt Lake Bees players
Scranton/Wilkes-Barre RailRiders players
Surprise Saguaros players